is a Japanese fishcake product made from ingredients such as fish surimi, salt, sugar, starch, monosodium glutamate and egg white. After mixing them well, they are wrapped around a bamboo or metal stick and steamed or broiled. The word chikuwa ("bamboo ring") comes from the shape when it is sliced.

Variants of surimi products such as kamaboko and satsuma age are popular. In Tottori, the per-household consumption has been the highest of all prefectures for the past 30 years, since the first year such records were kept. As it is cheap and a relatively low-fat source of protein, chikuwa is popular as a snack.

Chikuwa should not be confused with chikuwabu, which is an altogether different food product.

Composition

Choice of fish
The white fish used to make surimi (Japanese: 擂り身, literally "ground meat") include:

 Alaska pollock (Theragra chalcogramma)
 Various shark species (Selachimorpha)
 Various flying fish species (Exocoetidae)
 Okhotsk atka mackerel (Pleurogrammus azonus)
 Golden threadfin bream (Nemipterus virgatus)
 Black bass
 Smallmouth bass (Micropterus dolomieu)
 Largemouth bass (Micropterus salmoides)
 Florida black bass (Micropterus floridanus)

Use
Chikuwa can be eaten as-is. It is also often used as an ingredient for nimono like oden, chikuzenni, chirashizushi, udon, yakisoba, yasai-itame (Vegetable stir fry), and Japanese curry.

Regional variation
There are several regional varieties. In the east part of Tottori and part of Nagasaki, tofu chikuwa is produced that adds tofu to surimi. Often, firm tofu is the preferred selection.

In Yawatahama, Ehime, kawa-chikuwa (literally skin chikuwa) is produced: fish skin is wrapped around the skewers and broiled. This is a by-product of regular chikuwa, however, texture and taste are different.
  
In Shikokuchūō, Ehime, there is ebi-chikuwa, which contains shrimp paste in surimi.

In Komatsushima, Tokushima, there is take chikuwa (literally bamboo chikuwa), which remains on the bamboo after it is broiled.

Australian sushi restaurants may stuff the hollow with cheese (processed or soft ones like Brie) and deep-fry them in tempura batter.

See also

 Kamaboko
 Satsuma age
 Fish ball

External links

Japanese cuisine
Surimi